Çavdarlı is a village in the Hanak District, Ardahan Province, Turkey. Its population is 40 (2021).

References

Villages in Hanak District